Mary Randolph McCagg (born April 29, 1967 in Kirkland, Washington) is an American rower.  She finished 4th in the women's eight at the 1996 Summer Olympics. She rowed with her twin sister Elizabeth.

She graduated from Radcliffe College.

References

External links 
 
 

1967 births
Living people
Rowers at the 1992 Summer Olympics
Rowers at the 1996 Summer Olympics
American twins
Olympic rowers of the United States
Sportspeople from Kirkland, Washington
Twin sportspeople
World Rowing Championships medalists for the United States
American female rowers
Pan American Games medalists in rowing
Pan American Games gold medalists for the United States
Radcliffe College alumni
Rowers at the 1995 Pan American Games
Harvard Crimson women's rowers